Kudrinskaya is a rural locality (a village) and the administrative center of Vozhbalskoye Rural Settlement, Totemsky District, Vologda Oblast, Russia. The population was 281 as of 2002.

Geography 
Kudrinskaya is located 42 km west of Totma (the district's administrative centre) by road. Sergeyevo is the nearest rural locality.

References 

Rural localities in Totemsky District